Ngenjung Sari is a small sub-village located in Gianyar Regency on the island of Bali. Exactly at the north part of the capital of Gianyar city. If you want to find, just go straight from Beng village to the north, then you will find Git-git area, Angkling, finally turn right .

References

Populated places in Bali